Trang Football Club (Thai สโมสรฟุตบอลจังหวัดตรัง ) is a Thai semi-professional football club based in Trang Province. The club is currently playing in the Thai League 3 Southern region.

Timeline
History of events of Trang Football Club:

Honours

Domestic leagues
Regional League South Division
 Winners (1) : 2012
 Runners-up (1) : 2010

Stadium and locations

Seasons

P = Played
W = Games won
D = Games drawn
L = Games lost
F = Goals for
A = Goals against
Pts = Points
Pos = Final position

TPL = Thai Premier League

QR1 = First Qualifying Round
QR2 = Second Qualifying Round
QR3 = Third Qualifying Round
QR4 = Fourth Qualifying Round
RInt = Intermediate Round
R1 = Round 1
R2 = Round 2
R3 = Round 3

R4 = Round 4
R5 = Round 5
R6 = Round 6
GR = Group stage
QF = Quarter-finals
SF = Semi-finals
RU = Runners-up
S = Shared
W = Winners

Players

Current squad

References

External links
 Official Website
 Official Facebookpage

 
Football clubs in Thailand
Association football clubs established in 2010
2010 establishments in Thailand
Trang province